Following is a discography for the major solo works of American singer Michael McDonald.

Albums

Studio albums

Compilation albums

Live albums

Singles

Guest singles

Music videos

References

Further reading
 Michael McDonald interview by Pete Lewis, 'Blues & Soul' April 2008

Discographies of American artists
Pop music discographies